Cochleoceps is a genus of clingfishes endemic to the waters around Australia.

Species
There are currently five recognized species in this genus:
  Hutchins, 1983
 Cochleoceps bicolor Hutchins, 1991 (Western cleaner-clingfish)
 Cochleoceps orientalis Hutchins, 1991 (Eastern cleaner-clingfish)
 Cochleoceps spatula (Günther, 1861)
 Cochleoceps viridis Hutchins, 1991 (Green clingfish)

References

 
Gobiesocidae
Fish of Australia